The Erzgebirgsbahn (sometimes abbreviated as EGB) is a German railway company and a RegioNetz subsidiary of Deutsche Bahn. It operates in the Ore Mountains (German: Erzgebirge) region of southern Saxony, near the towns of Chemnitz and Zwickau.

The company is responsible for maintaining and operating services over five railway lines:

 Chemnitz – Flöha – Erdmannsdorf-Augustusburg – Hennersdorf – Wolkenstein – Annaberg-Buchholz – Cranzahl – Bärenstein – Vejprty.
Annaberg-Buchholz–Flöha railway
german section of Vejprty–Annaberg-Buchholz railway 
 Chemnitz – Flöha – Falkenau – Pockau-Lengefeld – Olbernhau/Marienberg.
active section of Reitzenhain–Flöha railway 
Pockau-Lengefeld–Neuhausen railway
 Chemnitz – Thalheim – Zwönitz – Aue. 
longest active section of Chemnitz–Adorf railway
 Zwickau – Aue – Schwarzenberg – Johanngeorgenstadt.
Zwickau–Schwarzenberg railway
Johanngeorgenstadt–Schwarzenberg railway
 Annaberg-Buchholz – Schwarzenberg. 
Annaberg-Buchholz–Schwarzenberg railway

The company also used to operate the Augustusburg Cable Railway, a funicular railway that connects Erdmannsdorf-Augustusburg on the Annaberg-Buchholz–Flöha railway with the town of Augustusburg from 2006 until 2015.

Profile 
The company is based in Chemnitz. The company has a total of around 260 employees (as of the beginning of 2009). The contract to spin off the company from Deutsche Bahn was signed on April 26, 2001. It is the second regional network of the DB after the Kurhessenbahn. Today around 150 trains run daily on the Erzgebirgsbahn network. Between 2002 and the beginning of 2008, the number of daily passengers increased from around 1200 to around 4600. According to its own information, the company has been leading the customer satisfaction statistics of the Deutsche Bahn rail transport companies since July 2002 (as of early 2008). In 2017 the number of passengers was 5200 per day, 252 employees worked for the company.  

The contract with the Central Saxony transport association for the provision of local rail transport services in the “Erzgebirgsnetz” was extended on June 24, 2016 at the previous conditions until the timetable change in June 2021.

References

External links
 

Railway companies of Germany
Transport in the Ore Mountains
Companies based in Chemnitz